Ganj Dareh (Persian: تپه گنج دره; "Treasure Valley" in Persian,  or "Treasure Valley Hill" if tepe/tappeh (hill) is appended to the name) is a Neolithic settlement in western Iran. It is located in the Harsin County in east of Kermanshah Province, in the central Zagros Mountains.

Research history
First discovered in 1965, it was excavated by Canadian archaeologist, Philip Smith during the 1960s and 1970s, for four field seasons.

The oldest settlement remains on the site date back to ca. 10,000 years ago, and have yielded the earliest evidence for goat domestication in the world.  The only evidence for domesticated crops found at the site so far is the presence of two-row barley.

The remains have been classified into five occupation levels, from A, at the top, to E.

Ceramics
Ganj Dareh is important in the study of Neolithic ceramics in Luristan and Kurdistan. This is a period beginning in the late 8th millennium, and continuing to the middle of the 6th millennium BC. Also, the evidence from two other excavated sites nearby is important, from Tepe Guran, and Tepe Sarab (shown on the map in this article). They are all located southwest of Harsin, on the Mahidasht plain, and in the Hulailan valley.

At Ganj Dareh, two early ceramic traditions are evident. One is based on the use of clay for figurines and small geometric pieces like cones and disks. These are dated ca. 7300-6900 BC.

The other ceramic tradition originated in the use of clay for mud-walled buildings (ca. 7300 BC). These traditions are also shared by Tepe Guran, and Tepe Sarab. Tepe Asiab is also located near Tepe Sarab, and may be the earliest of all these sites. Both sites appear to have been seasonally occupied. Another site from the same period is Chia Jani, also in Kermanshah. Chia Jani is located about 60 km southwest from Ganj Dareh.

Ali Kosh is also a related site of the Neolithic period.

Genetics
Researchers sequenced the genome from the petrous bone of a 30-50 year old woman from Ganj Dareh, GD13a. mtDNA analysis shows that she belonged to Haplogroup X. She is phenotypically similar to the Anatolian early farmers and Caucasus Hunter-Gatherers. Her DNA revealed that she had black hair, brown eyes and was lactose intolerant. The derived SLC45A2 variant associated with light
skin was not observed in GD13a, but the derived SLC24A5 variant which is also associated with the same trait was observed.

GD13a is genetically closest to the ancient Caucasus Hunter-Gatherers identified from human remains from Georgia (Satsurblia Cave and Kotias Klde), while also sharing genetic affinities with the people of the Yamna culture and the Afanasevo culture. She belonged to a population that was genetically distinct from the Neolithic Anatolian farmers. In terms of modern populations, she shows some genetic affinity with the Baloch people, Makrani caste and Brahui people, in actuality they are the closest to modern Zoroastrians in Iran. 

The oldest sample of haplogroup R2a was observed in the remains of a Neolithic human from Ganj Dareh in western Iran.

Gallery

References

Bibliography 

 Agelarakis A., The Palaeopathological Evidence, Indicators of Stress of the Shanidar Proto-Neolithic and the Ganj-Dareh Tepe Early Neolithic Human Skeletal Collections. Columbia University, 1989, Doctoral Dissertation, UMI, Bell & Howell Information Company, Michigan 48106.
 Robert J. Wenke: "Patterns in Prehistory: Humankind's first three million years" (1990)

External links
Peder Mortensen (2011), CERAMICS: The Neolithic Period in Central and Western Persia. iranicaonline.org
 Natural History Highlight: Old Goats In Transition , National Museum of Natural History (July 2000)

Relative chronology

1965 archaeological discoveries
Tells (archaeology)
Archaeological sites in Iran
Neolithic settlements
Harsin County
Buildings and structures in Kermanshah Province
Prehistoric Iran